The 2022–23 Kazakhstan Hockey Championship, known as the Pro Hokei Ligasy, was the 30th season since the founding of the Kazakhstan Hockey Championship. Saryarka Karaganda won the championship, defeating Arlan Kokshetau in the final.

Regular season

Standings

Play-off

Quarterfinals 
Saryarka Karaganda defeated Altay-Torpedo Ust-Kamenogorsk 4 games to 0
Arlan Kokshetau defeated Kulager Petropavl 4 games to 0
Beibarys Atyrau defeated HC Aktobe 4 games to 2
Nomad Astana defeated Torpedo Ust-Kamenogorsk 4 games to 1

Semifinals 
Saryarka Karaganda defeated Nomad Astana 4 games to 2
Arlan Kokshetau defeated Beibarys Atyrau 4 games to 3

Finals 
Saryarka Karaganda defeated Arlan Kokshetau 4 games to 3
Source:

Awards
 Best goaltender:  Ilya Rumyanstev (Arlan Kokshetau)
 Best defenceman: Edgars Siksna (Saryarka Karaganda)
 Best forward: Mikhail Rakhmanov (Saryarka Karaganda)
 Best rookie: Ivan Zinchenko (HC Aktobe)
Source:

References

Kazakhstan Hockey Championship seasons
Kazakhstan Hockey Championship